Rewa may refer to:

Places

Fiji
 Rewa (Fijian Communal Constituency, Fiji), a former electoral division of Fiji
 Rewa Plateau, between the Kaimur and Vindhya Ranges in Madhya Pradesh
 Rewa Province, Fiji
 Rewa River, the widest river in Fiji

Guyana
 Rewa River (Guyana)

India
 Rewa, Madhya Pradesh, a city
 Rewa district, Madhya Pradesh
 Rewa division, Madhya Pradesh
 Rewa (Lok Sabha constituency), Madhya Pradesh, India
 Rewa (princely state), a princely state in India
 Rewa (Vidhan Sabha constituency), Madhya Pradesh
 Alternate name for the Narmada River

Poland
 Rewa, Poland, a village in Pomeranian Voivodeship

Other uses
 HMHS Rewa, a British hospital ship Rewa sunk by a U-boat off the Bristol Channel in 1918
 Rewa F.C., a Fijian football team
 Rewa's Village, a community project in Kerikeri, New Zealand
 Rewa Ultra Mega Solar plant in Rewa district, India

See also
 Révay